Russ Gray Pond is a small lake east of Beerston in Delaware County, New York. It drains west via Beers Brook which flows into the West Branch Delaware River.

See also
 List of lakes in New York

References 

Lakes of New York (state)
Lakes of Delaware County, New York